Léba is a department or commune of Zondoma Province in Burkina Faso.

References 

Departments of Burkina Faso
Zondoma Province